The Ringbone Formation is a Campanian geologic formation in southwestern New Mexico.

Description
The bulk of the formation is dark shale with minor sandstone and black limestone. The upper beds are tuffaceous sandstone with minor black limestone. A basalt flow and an andesite breccia are present in the upper beds. The formation interfingers with the underlying Mojado Formation and is overlain by the Hidalgo Formation.

Fossils
The formation contains fossils of the gastropod Physa, the palm Sabal, and other fossils consistent with Campanian age.

Dinosaur remains of tyrannosaurs and hadrosaurs are among the fossils that have been recovered from the formation. These include possible remains of Albertosaurus and a hadrosaur tail skin impression.

History of investigation
The formation was first named as the Ringbone Shale by Lasky in 1938 for outcrops near Ringbone Ranch in the Little Hatchet Mountains. Zeller renamed the unit as the Ringbone Formation in 1970.

See also 
 List of dinosaur-bearing rock formations
 List of stratigraphic units with indeterminate dinosaur fossils

References

Bibliography 
 
 
 
 
 
 
 

Campanian Stage
Cretaceous formations of New Mexico
Mudstone formations
Sandstone formations of the United States
Deltaic deposits
Lacustrine deposits